The Idavada Volcanics is a geologic formation in Idaho. It preserves fossils dating back to the Neogene period.

See also

 List of fossiliferous stratigraphic units in Idaho
 Paleontology in Idaho

References
 

Geologic formations of Idaho
Neogene stratigraphic units of North America